Milovan Vesnić is a Serbian Car racing professional known for participating in European Touring Car Cup events.

Racing record

Complete European Touring Car Cup results
(key) (Races in bold indicate pole position) (Races in italics indicate fastest lap)

References

External links

1976 births
Living people
Sportspeople from Užice
Serbian racing drivers
European Touring Car Cup drivers
TCR Europe Touring Car Series drivers